Pallippuram (also known in English as Palliport or in Portuguese as Paliporte) is a village on Vypeen island, in Kochi, Kerala, south India. The village is located approximately 25 km from Ernakulam and 20 km from Cochin International Airport. The east border is Periyar River, and the Arabian Sea in the west. 

Nearby attractions include the famous Cherai Beach, Pallipuram Fort, Munambam Fishing Harbour and Muziris beach( Golden Beach ). Pallippuram Fort was built by the Portuguese in 1503. It is one of the oldest existing European monuments in India. The Catholic Basilica at Pallippuram known as Church of "Our Lady of Snow" or "Manjumatha" is an important pilgrim centre for Christians.

See also
Ernakulam District
Vypin
North Paravur
Cherai
Pallippuram church is raised to the status of a basilica in the month of October 2012

External links

 http://www.kottapuramdiocese.org/CURIOS.htm
 http://www.kerala-travel-tours.com/forts_of_kerala/pallippuram_fort.html
 http://www.webindia123.com/tourism/beach/cherai.htm
 http://manjumatha.wordpress.com

Tourism in Kerala